The women's 400 metre freestyle event at the 2015 European Games in Baku took place on 24 June at the Aquatic Palace.

Results

Heats
The heats were started at 09:45.

Final
The final was held at 17:34.

References

Women's 400 metre freestyle
2015 in women's swimming